Loch Glascarnoch is a  reservoir in the highlands of Scotland between Ullapool and Inverness. It is dammed on its eastern end.

The reservoir was created in 1957 and forms part of the Conon Hydro-electric Power Scheme. The A835 runs along its southern edge, and the loch is a popular stop off point for motorists.

In the summer of 2020, water levels in the reservoir receded to the extent that old croft houses and bridges that were submerged when the reservoir was flooded were revealed.

References 

Reservoirs in Scotland
Lochs of Highland (council area)